Nora Coton-Pélagie (born 22 April 1988 in Les Lilas, Seine-Saint-Denis) is a French football player who currently plays for French club Le Havre of the Division 1 Féminine. She plays as an attacking midfielder and is a former women's youth international having played at all levels. Coton-Pélagie played at both the 2006 UEFA Women's Under-19 Championship and 2008 FIFA U-20 Women's World Cup where she formed excellent partnerships with current senior internationals Eugénie Le Sommer and Marie-Laure Delie. She is the daughter of Bruno Coton-Pélagie, who is currently the manager of Championnat de France amateur 2 club FC Les Lilas.

Career
Coton-Pélagie began playing football at the club where her father coached and he brother played as amateur, FC Les Lilas. She played in the lower levels of French football with Blanc-Mesnil and CNFE Clairefontaine before joining D1 sides ASJ Soyaux and Paris Saint-Germain.

Coton-Pélagie joined D2 side Olympique de Marseille, and helped the club gain promotion to D1. In 2020, she joined the feminine squad of AS Nancy.

References

External links
  
 Nora Coton-Pelagie at footofeminin.fr 
 
 
 

1988 births
Living people
People from Les Lilas
French women's footballers
Paris Saint-Germain Féminine players
CNFE Clairefontaine players
ASJ Soyaux-Charente players
AS Saint-Étienne (women) players
Olympique de Marseille (women) players
Division 1 Féminine players
Women's association football midfielders
Footballers from Seine-Saint-Denis
GPSO 92 Issy players